!Action Pact! was a London-based punk rock band, formed in 1981 by guitarist Wild Planet, bassist Kim Igoe, George Cheex, and drummer Joe Fungus. They would later break up in 1986.

History
!Action Pact! was from Stanwell in Middlesex, and was also originally named Bad Samaritans. In 1981 they changed their name to !Action Pact!. The John from Dead Mans Shadow (D.M.S.) was Bad Samaritan's original lead singer, and he left to concentrate on D.M.S., before the name change.  He was replaced by George Cheex, who got the job because of "her courage to scream along with the band's songs."  They contributed two songs to the EP Heathrow Touchdown which was released in October, 1981, while George and Joe were still only 15 years old. "London Bouncers" and "All Purpose Action Footwear", got the attention of BBC Radio 1 DJ John Peel.  He played their songs often and he convinced the band to record their first full session, which they did on 22 February 1982. They recorded "People", "Suicide Bag", "Mindless Aggression", "Losers", and "Cowslick Blues". The resulting demo tape caught the attention of the fledgling label Fall Out Records, which signed the band as the first act on its roster.  !Action Pact!'s label debut, the Suicide Bag EP, was released in July 1982 and rocketed to the top of the British punk chart.

The band would later be joined by drummer Grimly Fiendish and bassist Thistles, and producer Phil Langham would also moonlight on bass under the name Elvin Pelvin; whereas Kim Igoe, the bassist, continued on as a lyricist. The band split in 1986.

In early 2016, Wild Planet (Des Stanley) died from cancer.

Other projects
Wild Planet managed the heavy rock band Purge, in which his son, Mark Stanley, plays bass guitar; Purge has sometimes played a live cover version of !Action Pact!'s "London Bouncers". Joe Fungus also played with the punk band called Savage Upsurge.

Discography
Chart positions shown are from the UK Indie Chart.

Albums

Singles/EPs

Footnotes

References

External links
TrouserPress.com :: ¡Action Pact!

Musical groups established in 1981
Musical groups disestablished in 1986
English punk rock groups